The former First Church of Christ, Scientist, located at 2200 Overlook Road, in the University Circle area of Cleveland, Ohio, in the United States is an historic building that was added to the National Register of Historic Places on February 20, 2003.

Built from 1929 to 1931 at a cost of $1 million, it was designed by the noted Cleveland firm of Walker and Weeks, who later designed Severance Hall, to which this building is sometimes compared.  An unusual feature of the building is its tall minaret-like semi-detached bell tower, which now functions only as a smokestack. Known today as the Nottingham-Spirk Innovation Center, the building is now owned by Nottingham Spirk, which from 2003 to 2005 renovated it for its headquarters. The present First Church of Christ, Scientist building is located at 3181 Fairmount Boulevard in Cleveland Heights.

See also
National Register of Historic Places listings in Cleveland, Ohio
List of former Christian Science churches, societies and buildings
First Church of Christ, Scientist (disambiguation)

References

External links

 National Register listings for Cuyahoga County, Ohio
 Innovation Center Historic Landmark - has pictures of renovated building 
 Encyclopedia of Cleveland History - "Christian Scientists"

Churches in Cleveland
Churches on the National Register of Historic Places in Ohio
Former Christian Science churches, societies and buildings in Ohio
University Circle
National Register of Historic Places in Cleveland, Ohio